Movilița is a commune located in Ialomița County, Muntenia, Romania. It is composed of three villages: Bițina-Pământeni, Bițina-Ungureni and Movilița.

References

Communes in Ialomița County
Localities in Muntenia